Macháček (feminine Macháčková) is a Czech surname. Notable people with the surname include: 

 Alex Machacek, Austrian guitarist
 Dušan Macháček, Czech rower
 Jan Macháček, Czech rugby player
 Jiří Macháček, Czech actor
 John Machacek, American journalist
 Josef Macháček, Czech rally driver
 Martin Macháček, Czech footballer
 Miroslav Macháček, Czech stage actor
 Spencer Machacek, Canadian ice hockey player

Czech-language surnames